The Suburban Satanists is a comic strip that appears in Herman Hedning, a comic published eight times a year in Sweden and Norway. The strip began in 1997 in the comic Geek before restarting in 1999 in its current home. It is created, written and drawn by British cartoonist Lew Stringer. The Suburban Satanists are the DeVille family (the name is a spoof of the Devil), led by the father Stan DeVille, his wife Mavis, and including their grown up children Derek and Sharon. This mini-cult is rounded off with the inclusion of Sharon's son Damien (product of a tryst between Sharon and Satan) and the house lodger Benny.

The local Vicar (as yet unnamed) is a regular supporting character, as is Satan himself, who is often depicted as a pompous and flawed buffoon. 

The strip doesn't promote Satanism, but rather sets it up for satire, along with Christianity (so as not to favour either side). A typical strip might begin with a dramatic ritual, summoning forth Satan, only for him to be asked to change a light bulb or lend the family a cup of sugar. In another story Mavis is made Queen of Hell while Satan takes a Mediterranean holiday, but when he returns he finds she's converted his domain into a Nail Bar. The humour is light-hearted and mostly inoffensive, although slight criticism has actually been received by both Christians and Satanists.

1997 comics debuts
Swedish comic strips
British comic strips
Satanism in popular culture
Fiction about the Devil